Ari-Mikko Kuustonen (born 4 March 1960 in Leppävirta, Finland) is a Finnish singer-songwriter and television personality.

In 1998 Kuustonen was the first Finn to be nominated as a UNFPA Goodwill Ambassador. The following year he was awarded the Church's Peace Prize (Kirkon rauhanpalkinto). In 2003 he was nominated as The Most Positive Finn.

Kuustonen's daughters Iina Kuustonen and Minka Kuustonen are both actresses.

Studio albums 
 Jää kuuntelemaan (1979)
 Musta jalokivi (1991)
 Abrakadabra (1992)
 Aurora (1994)
 Valon valtakunta (1994)
 Siksak (1996)
 Seepran varjo (1997)
 Atlantis (2000)
 Musta (2003)
 Hietaniemi (2007)
 Profeetta (2008)
 Agricolankatu 11 (2017)

References

External links 
 Mikko Kuustonen's Official web site
 

1960 births
Living people
20th-century Finnish male singers
Finnish songwriters
People from Leppävirta
21st-century Finnish male singers